ACDT may refer to:

 Apple Certified Desktop Technician, a computer certification
 Australian Central Daylight Time, a time in Australia